Craigavon is a town in northern County Armagh, Northern Ireland. Its construction began in 1965 and it was named after the first Prime Minister of Northern Ireland: James Craig, 1st Viscount Craigavon. It was intended to be the heart of a new linear city incorporating Lurgan and Portadown, but this plan was mostly abandoned and later described as having been flawed. Among local people today, "Craigavon" refers to the area between the two towns. It is built beside a pair of artificial lakes and is made up of a large residential area (Brownlow), a second smaller one (Mandeville), plus a central area (Highfield) that includes a substantial shopping centre, a courthouse and the district council headquarters. The area around the lakes is a public park and wildlife haven made up of woodland with walking trails. There is also a watersports centre, golf course and ski slope in the area. In most of Craigavon, motor vehicles are completely separated from pedestrians, and roundabouts are used extensively. It hosted the headquarters of the former Craigavon Borough Council.

Craigavon sometimes refers to the much larger Craigavon Urban Area, a name used by the Northern Ireland Statistics and Research Agency, which includes Craigavon, Lurgan, Portadown and Aghacommon.

History

Original plans
   
Craigavon was planned as a 'new city' for Northern Ireland that would mirror towns such as Cumbernauld and, later, Milton Keynes in Great Britain. It was conceived as a linear city that would link the towns of Lurgan and Portadown to create a single urban area and identity. The argument for a new town was based on projections indicating population increases over the following decades that would require large-scale house building. Similar projects successfully attracting economic growth had been successfully completed in Great Britain, so it was in some ways a symbol of Northern Ireland as both modern and a part of the British mainstream. The Craigavon Development Commission was appointed in October 1965 to develop the 'new city'. About 6,000 acres of land between Lurgan and Portadown was vested from farmers at £6 an acre. Several reasons have been suggested for the suitability of the site including the existing population centres, industrial base, nearness to Belfast and the belief that Craigavon would help spread development away from Belfast. It was hoped that residents of Belfast would be attracted by the suburban nature of Craigavon's design and that business would see it as an interesting alternative. Cash incentives were offered to some families moving to Craigavon. The M1 motorway was built to link the new city with Belfast and there were plans to replace the Lurgan and Portadown railway stations with a single high speed terminal in central Craigavon. The Craigavon Area Hospital was built to replace small hospitals in the two towns.

The design of Craigavon was based on Modernism and imbued with the spirit of the age. The planners separated motor vehicles from pedestrians and cyclists wherever possible, creating a network of paths allowing residents to travel across Craigavon without encountering traffic. The road network for motor vehicles used roundabouts instead of traffic lights at junctions, giving the planners the ability to easily increase the number of lanes if it became necessary. Electricity and other cables were placed underground and street lighting was standard throughout. The planners clustered the housing developments around small 'village centres' with associated retail space, leisure facilities, post offices, primary schools, pharmacies, community centres and other civic amenities. All estates were built with security in mind, with one vehicle entry/exit point. Single-use zoning was part of the design; there was a total separation of industrial land-use from all other uses.

Craigavon was designed to be a very child-friendly environment with small playgrounds dotted throughout the residential areas. There was an emphasis on providing green space in the housing estates and safe paths to cycle on. National Cycle Route 9 passes through the town. The new town was also provided with many civic amenities including a leisure centre, library, shopping centre, civic centre, a large park with artificial lakes, playing fields, a petting zoo, public gardens and an artificial ski slope. Craigavon Civic Centre was built at a cost of £3 million and was officially opened by the Duke of Abercorn in April 1983.

Difficulties
There was controversy over the decision to build a 'new city' in the mainly Protestant/unionist east rather than to develop the mainly Catholic city of Derry. There was also controversy over the decision to name it after The 1st Viscount Craigavon (1871–1940), a Protestant unionist leader. Some unionists also felt the decision was unwise and counterproductive to building cross-community relations. Knockmena (a corruption of the townland name, Knockmenagh) was the preferred name nationalists hoped would be used, and which might have attracted broad acceptance on both sides. On 6 July 1965, it was announced that the new city would be named Craigavon after Craig. A noted nationalist, Joseph Connellan, interrupted the announcement with the comment, "A Protestant city for a Protestant people".

Problems began to come to light when it emerged that some housing estates had been built with materials and techniques that had not been fully tested, with the result that insulation, sound-proofing and durability were lacking. This was compounded by the outbreak of  'the Troubles' in the late 1960s, which resulted in sectarian violence and segregation. Investment into Northern Ireland dried up and emigration rose. The Craigavon Development Commission was wound up in 1973 and Craigavon Borough Council created. The area's main employer, Goodyear, had a large fan-belt factory in the Silverwood industrial estate, and at the time it was Europe's largest factory. However, the plant failed to make money on a consistent basis, and had to shut in 1983.

Consequently, about half of what was planned was never built, and of what was built, some had to be demolished after becoming empty and derelict. The area designated as Craigavon 'city centre', for much of this time contained only the municipal authority, the court buildings and a shopping mall, surrounded by greenfield land. Dr Stephen McKay, director of education at the School of Planning, Architecture & Civil Engineering at Queen's University Belfast, said that the plan to build Craigavon was "flawed from the outset", adding: "The cycle ways, mixed housing and recreational zones were really never going to work in light of the circumstances". Locally-born writer Newton Emerson said: "As a child, I didn't notice the failure of Craigavon. The new city was an enormous playground of hidden cycle paths, roads that ended suddenly in the middle of nowhere and futuristic buildings standing empty in an artificial landscape". Craigavon became notorious for its many roundabouts.

The identity of a new city never really caught on. The name 'Craigavon' is today used by locals to refer to the area between Lurgan and Portadown, and many citizens of those towns resent being identified with the 'new city' of Craigavon. The intention to integrate the new city also largely failed, with those who were encouraged to move from other parts of Northern Ireland generally choosing where to live based on proximity to each respective town, i.e., Catholics/nationalists moved to estates close to Lurgan, whereas Protestants/unionists gravitated towards the Portadown area.

The Troubles
There were many violent incidents in Craigavon related to the Troubles, in which a number of people were killed.

On 11 November 1982, three Provisional Irish Republican Army (IRA) members—Eugene Toman (21), Sean Burns (21) and Gervaise McKerr (31)—were shot dead by undercover Royal Ulster Constabulary officers at a vehicle checkpoint on Tullygally East Road. They were unarmed, leading to claims of a shoot-to-kill policy by security forces. The RUC denied this, saying the men had driven through the checkpoint.

The Craigavon mobile shop killings took place on 28 March 1991, when the Ulster Volunteer Force (UVF) shot dead three Catholic civilians in the Drumbeg estate. A gunman shot the two teenage girls working in the mobile shop: Eileen Duffy (19) and Katrina Rennie (16). He then forced a male customer, Brian Frizzell (29), to lie on the pavement and shot him also. There are allegations of collusion between the UVF and police.

On 14 November 1991 the UVF shot dead three more civilians on Carbet Road as they were driving home from work at the Hyster forklift factory: Desmond Rogers (54), Fergus Magee (28), and John Lavery (27).

The Continuity IRA shot dead PSNI officer Stephen Carroll in Craigavon on 10 March 2009, the first police fatality in Northern Ireland since the Good Friday Agreement in 1998.

Geography

Craigavon lies on an area of flat land near the southeastern shore of Lough Neagh. The surrounding settlements (listed clockwise) are Aghacommon (north), Lurgan (northeast), Corcreeny (east), Bleary (southeast) and Portadown (southwest). It is separated from these surrounding settlements mostly by fields.

Craigavon is built beside two artificial lakes called Craigavon Lakes. The Portadown–Lurgan railway line runs between the two lakes, and further north is the M1 motorway, which runs parallel with the railway line. The area around Craigavon Lakes is a public park and wildlife haven made up of woodland with walking trails. In 2017 it was awarded the best park in Northern Ireland by Fields in Trust. Recent plans to build in the park, beginning with a college campus, have met opposition from some locals.

Townlands
Much of Craigavon is within the civil parish of Seagoe. The following is a list of townlands within Craigavon's urban area (excluding Lurgan, Portadown and Bleary), along with their likely etymologies:
 Balteagh
 Clanrolla (from Cluain Drola meaning "meadow of the shaft")
 Crossmacahilly (from Cros Mhic Eachmhilidh meaning "McAughley's crossroads")
 Drumgask (from Druim gCásca meaning "Easter ridge")
 Drumgor (from Druim gCorr meaning "ridge of the herons")
 Drumnagoon (from Dromainn Uí Dhubháin meaning "O'Doone's ridge")
 Knockmenagh (from An Cnoc Meánach meaning "the middle hill")
 Legaghory or Legahory (from Log a' Choire meaning "hollow of the cauldron")
 Monbrief (historically also Moybreefe, perhaps from Má Bhreagh meaning "plain of the rising ground" or Má Bhréach, "plain of wolves")
 Moyraverty or Moyraferty (from Maigh Raifeartaigh meaning "Raifeartach's plain")
 Tamnafiglassan (from Tamhnach an Ghlasáin meaning "grassy field of the finch")
 Tannaghmore West (from Tamhnach Mór meaning "big grassy field")
 Tullygally (from Tulaigh Geala meaning "white hills")

Demography
For census purposes, Craigavon is not treated as a separate entity by the NI Statistics and Research Agency (NISRA). Instead, it is combined with Portadown, Lurgan and Bleary to form the "Craigavon Urban Area". This makes it difficult to glean an accurate demographic picture of the area that is generally regarded as Craigavon – the mainly residential area between Portadown and Lurgan. This area roughly corresponds with the Drumgask, Drumgor, Kernan and (part of) Taghnevan electoral wards.

On Census Day (27 March 2011) the usually resident population of Craigavon District Electoral Area was 25,287 accounting for 1.40% of the NI total. 
 96.92% were from the white (including Irish Traveller) ethnic group;
 49.12% belong to or were brought up in the Catholic Christian church and 44.12% belong to or were brought up in a 'Protestant and Other Christian (including Christian related)' churches; and
 46.47% indicated that they had a British national identity, 25.04% had an Irish national identity and 29.72% had a Northern Irish national identity.
Respondents could indicate more than one national identity
 
On Census Day 27 March 2011, in Craigavon District Electoral Area, considering the population aged 3 years old and over:
 
 10.17% had some knowledge of Irish;
 4.83% had some knowledge of Ulster-Scots; and
 6.95% did not have English as their first language.

Through the late 1970s and early 1980s, Craigavon hosted many families of Refugees of the Vietnam War.

Craigavon has been a historically Protestant town; however, in recent times, the electorate has become gradually less so, with higher numbers of Catholics and people of other religions or people of no declared religion.

Education
Craigavon has a number of schools.

Primary
Drumgor Primary School (Controlled)
St Anthony's Primary School (Catholic Maintained)
St Brendan's Primary School (Catholic Maintained)
 Tullygally Primary School (Controlled) - a mixed religion school. It has about 100 pupils at any one time. It was built by the government with the original founding of Craigavon and was part of the library board. The size of the primary school was reduced in recent years and half of it now accommodates an adult learning centre. There are many more primary and secondary schools in the wider Craigavon areas of Lurgan, Portadown, etc.

Post-primary
Brownlow Integrated College (Controlled) - one of the first integrated secondary schools in Northern Ireland
Lismore Comprehensive School (Catholic Maintained)

There are also plans to build a Southern Regional College campus beside Craigavon Lake. The plans have met opposition from some locals, as it would involve the destruction of woodland which is home to endangered wildlife.

Sport
A.F.C. Craigavon play association football in the Mid-Ulster Football League.
Éire Óg Gaelic Football Club – competes in Division II of the Armagh All County League. Have won both Junior and Intermediate honours.
Craigavon United F.C. – football club – won the Milk Cup in 1986.
Craigavon City F.C. – football club founded in 2007. In their first season they finished 4th in the Mid Ulster fourth division and won the John Magee Memorial Cup after a 2–1 victory over Armagh Rovers.
Craigavon Cowboys – the only American football team in County Armagh. 2009 Winners of the IAFL DV8s league. Returned to the IAFL proper in 2010.

Twin towns
Craigavon is twinned with:

 LaGrange, Georgia, United States
 Ballina, County Mayo, Republic of Ireland

See also

List of towns and villages in Northern Ireland

References

External links

Culture Northern Ireland

New towns in Northern Ireland
New towns started in the 1960s
Towns in County Armagh